Alexis Kouros (born 1961, in Kermanshah, Iran) is an Iranian-Finnish writer, documentary-maker, director, and producer.

His first book, Gondwana's Children, won the Finlandia Junior award in 1997. His first film was the 2000 documentary, Waiting for Godot at De Gaulle, the story of Mehran Karimi Nasseri.

He also directed a documentary called Without My Daughter in response to the 1991 Hollywood movie, Not Without My Daughter.
He started his production company Dream Catcher. The company started publishing Finland's first English language monthly called SixDegrees in 2003. Helsinki Times, a weekly English newspaper was established by Dream Catcher in April 2007. Kouros went on to become the editor in chief for the Helsinki Times.

Kourosh is an Iranian Kurd.

Works

Books 

 
 Harmattan, the Traveler and the Dream Catcher

Films 

Waiting for Godot at De Gaulle, 2000
Without my Daughter, 2002
Rubina doesn't live here anymore.., 2002
Chosen, 2003
Rooted
Kokonainen, 2005

TV series

Finnish Cinema
Great Finns: Lönnrot

References

External links

Dream Catcher
SixDegrees Magazine
 Alexis Kouros' Biography
Helsinki Times

Finnish writers
Finnish film directors
Iranian emigrants to Finland
Iranian writers
Iranian film directors
People from Kermanshah
1961 births
Living people
Finlandia Junior Prize winners
Finnish people of Kurdish descent
Iranian Kurdish people